Alejandro Blanco Bravo (born 9 October 1950 in Orense) is the current President of the Spanish Olympic Committee.

On September 8, 2011, it was announced that he would preside Madrid's bid to host the 2020 Summer Olympics.

References

1950 births
Living people
Spanish male judoka